The Florida Registry of Interpreters for the Deaf (FRID) is a non profit organization aimed at helping interpreters for the deaf and hard of hearing living within the state of Florida. FRID is a state affiliate of the Registry of Interpreters for the Deaf. FRID has over 950 members as of 2009.

Florida Quality Assurance Screening System 

The Florida Quality Assurance Screening System is administered by FRID for the purpose of screening sign language interpreters within Florida. The examination is broken into two parts: Written and Performance. Florida Registry of Interpreters for the Deaf (FRID) no longer offers in-state quality assurance screenings as per their agreement with Registry of Interpreters of the Deaf (RID).

Florida Educational Interpreter Evaluation 

The Florida Educational Interpreter Evaluation is administered by FRID for the purpose of screening sign language interpreters within Florida who work in K-12 settings. The examination is broken into three parts: Written, Interview, and Performance. Florida Registry of Interpreters for the Deaf (FRID) no longer offers in-state educational interpreter screenings as per their agreement with Registry of Interpreters of the Deaf (RID).

References

External links 

  Florida Registry of Interpreters for the Deaf official website.
 RID.org Registry of Interpreters for the Deaf

Translation associations of the United States
Organizations based in Florida
Sign language